Clarence Edward "Mac" McKnight Jr. (9 September 1929 – 29 July 2022) was a lieutenant general in the United States Army whose assignments included Director of the Command, Control and Communications Systems Organization of the Joint Chiefs of Staff; deputy commandant and commandant of the Signal Training Centre and commanding general of Fort Gordon. He graduated from the United States Military Academy in 1952 with a B.S. degree in engineering. He later earned an M.S.E. degree in electrical engineering from the University of Michigan in 1961.

His military honors include the Defense Distinguished Service Medal, two Army Distinguished Service Medals, the Defense Superior Service Medal, the Legion of Merit, three Bronze Star Medals, four Meritorious Service Medals and an Air Medal. He died in 2022, at the age of 92.

References

1929 births
2022 deaths
People from Memphis, Tennessee
United States Military Academy alumni
United States Army personnel of the Korean War
University of Michigan College of Engineering alumni
United States Army personnel of the Vietnam War
Recipients of the Air Medal
Recipients of the Meritorious Service Medal (United States)
Recipients of the Legion of Merit
United States Army generals
Recipients of the Defense Superior Service Medal
Recipients of the Distinguished Service Medal (US Army)
Recipients of the Defense Distinguished Service Medal
Burials at Arlington National Cemetery